The Palestine Solidarity Campaign (PSC) is an activist organisation in England and Wales.  It was incorporated in the UK in 2004 as Palestine Solidarity Campaign Ltd.

Structure
The Palestine Solidarity Campaign (PSC) is an activist organisation in England and Wales, based in London. It is politically unaligned. There are also the Scottish Palestine Solidarity Campaign and the Ireland Palestine Solidarity Campaign. The latter is a separate organisation set up in late 2001 by established Irish human rights and community activists. Hugh Lanning and Tony Greenstein have both been involved with the group. In 2017, Jewish News reported that Lanning (then chair of PSC) was barred from entering Israel; the Israeli embassy in the UK said this was in part due to his connections with Hamas, which the EU had declared a terrorist organization.

Boycott Israeli goods campaign
In 2010, the Trade Union Congress (TUC) agreed to boycott produce grown on Israeli settlements. The PSC organised disruptions of a performance by the Israel Philharmonic at the Royal Albert Hall in February 2011. BBC Radio 3, which was broadcasting the concert live, was forced to suspend the broadcast several times due to the protesters' shouting and heckling.

On 28 May 2012, when Israel's Habima theatre company performed at the London Shakespeare's Globe Theatre, the PSC and other BDS groups organised a protest outside the building. On 29 May 2012, BBC Radio 4 reported that Habima was "being criticised for performing to Jewish audiences in the Occupied Territories." A PSC press release corrected the report, saying that it was criticising Habima "for performing in illegal Israeli settlements in the West Bank." After six months of pressure by PSC, the BBC Trust upheld the PSC's complaint. The Trust report stated "the complaint was upheld with regard to Accuracy, not upheld with regard to Impartiality and Fairness." The PSC waged a two-year campaign to block an EU trade agreement, the ACAA, that recognised Israeli pharmaceutical standards as equal to those in Europe. The agreement was passed in October 2012.

Other activism
Sarah Colborne (then director of the PSC) was on board the Mavi Marmara during the 2010 flotilla raid. The PSC arranged a 30 March 2012 "Land Day" protest outside the Israeli Embassy in London.

Launching a campaign against what it termed Israeli apartheid in 2019, the PSC announced that universities in the UK were investing almost £450 million in companies which were aiding in Israeli breaches of international law. It produced a database of these investments. Also in 2019 the PSC signed a letter alongside over 200 other groups calling on the International Criminal Court to begin investigating war crimes committed by Israeli in the Palestinian territories.

In 2021, the PSC organized a march in support of Palestine in London which was attended by over 180,000 people. Other events took place in Bristol, Nottingham and Peterborough. The group was protesting against an Israeli bombing offensive which had killed over 230 people in eleven days. Black Lives Matter supported the march.

See also
 Economic and political boycotts of Israel
 Palestine Action
 Students for Justice in Palestine –  also known as Palestine Solidarity Committee

References

External links
Palestine Solidarity Campaign

1982 establishments in the United Kingdom
British companies established in 2004
Non-governmental organizations involved in the Israeli–Palestinian conflict
Organizations established in 1982
Political advocacy groups in the United Kingdom
Palestinian solidarity movement